My Tender Matador is a 2020 Chilean drama film directed by Rodrigo Sepúlveda with a screenplay written by the same Sepúlveda, alongside Juan Elias Tovar. It is based on Pedro Lemebel's novel of the same name.

Plot
Chile, 1986, a few days before Pinochet's attempted assassination.

It's the love story between "the Queen of the Corner" (Castro), a middle aged travesti who embroiders tablecloths for military wives, and young Carlos (Ortizgris), a guerrilla member of the Manuel Rodríguez Patriotic Front.

Cast
 Alfredo Castro as "la loca del frente"
 Leonardo Ortizgris as "Carlos"
 Amparo Noguera as "Doña Olguita"
 Sergio Hernández as "Rana"
 Julieta Zylberberg as "Laura"
 Luis Gnecco as "Myrna"
 Ezequiel Díaz as "Lupe"
 Paulina Urrutia as "Doña Clarita"
 Gastón Salgado as "Pimp"
 Erto Pantoja as "Bodyguard"
 Victor Montero as "Militar 1"
 Jaime Leiva as "Militar 2"
 Daniel Antivilo as "Toñita"
 Marcelo Alonso as "girl from the choir 1"
 Pedro Fontaine as "girl from the choir 2"
 Manuel Peña as "girl from the choir 3"
 Paula Leoncini as  "detenaid woman"

Production
For many years, the idea of adapting to the cinema the novel by the Chilean artist Pedro Lemebel was being handled. Director Rodrigo Sepúlveda and Lemebel himself were strongly involved. There were many reasons that postponed the project, lack of funding, disagreements between parts, copyrights for the cinematographic work, the authorship of the script, etc. There was much speculation about the problems among everyone involved in something that the producer once called his "most ambitious project to date."
Complications reached a very high point after Lemebel's death in 2015.

In 2019, it was announced that after signing a pre-agreement, the filming would begin with director Rodrigo Sepúlveda and a cast headed by the Chilean actor Alfredo Castro (according to Lemebel's own wishes). At the same time it was reported that two musicians and songwriters from Argentina and Chile would take care of the music, the incidental music would be in charge of Pedro Aznar and the arrangement and selection of songs (a fundamental part of the entire work) would be handled by Manuel García.

Subsequently, Leonardo Ortizgris and Julieta Zylberberg joined the cast, which is completed by Sergio Hernández, Luis Gnecco and Amparo Noguera.

The producers sought to release the film as part of the 2020 Berlin International Film Festival. Ultimately, the film premiered as part of the 2020 Venice Days.

References

External links
 
 
2020 films
2020 drama films
Chilean drama films
Chilean historical films
LGBT-related drama films
Films set in Chile
Films shot in Chile
Chilean LGBT-related films
Spanish LGBT-related films
2020 LGBT-related films
2020s Spanish-language films
2020s Chilean films